The 2022 St. George Illawarra Dragons season will be the 24th in the joint venture club's history. The Dragons' men's team will compete in the NRL's 2022 Telstra Premiership season. The women's team, will play their fifth season in the NRLW's 2022 Telstra Women's Premiership season.

Squad

Gains and losses

Ladder

Ladder progression

Season results

Pre-season trials

NRL season

Representative honours

References 

St. George Illawarra Dragons seasons
St. George Illawarra Dragons
2022 NRL Women's season